Blue Ballads is an album by saxophonist Archie Shepp and his quartet which was recorded in New York City in 1995 and released on the Venus label.

Reception

The AllMusic review by arwulf arwulf called it and its counterparts Black Ballads, and True Ballads "intimate studies in shared introspection...[that] document Shepp's astute exploration of the ballad form during the 1990s...Once again and in all the best ways, Shepp shines in parallel with his contemporary Pharoah Sanders. Both are skilled balladeers as well as free spirits who simply cannot be bottled or pigeonholed".

Track listing
 "Little Girl Blue" (Richard Rodgers, Lorenz Hart) – 6:03
 "More Than You Know" (Billy Rose, Edward Eliscu, Vincent Youmans) – 7:18
 "Blue in Green" (Bill Evans, Miles Davis) – 7:58
 "Blue and Sentimental" (Count Basie) – 5:12
 "Cry Me a River" (Arthur Hamilton) – 7:54
 "If I Should Lose You" (Leo Robin, Ralph Rainger) – 7:32
 "Alone Together" (Arthur Schwartz, Howard Dietz) – 10:51

Personnel
Archie Shepp – tenor saxophone, soprano saxophone, vocals
George Mraz – bass
John Hicks – piano
Idris Muhammad – drums
Production
Iruka Studio – design
Troy Halderson – engineer
Brock South – assistant engineer
Shuji Kitamura – mastering
Dennis Stock – cover photography
Tetsuo Hara – producer

References

Venus Records albums
Archie Shepp albums
1995 albums